Miguel Ángel Luque Santiago (born 23 July 1990) is a Spanish professional footballer who plays as a midfielder for CE Manresa.

Club career

Spain
Born in Sabadell, Barcelona, Catalonia, Luque only played lower league football in his country. He started with Villarreal CF's third team in Tercera División, then joined FC Barcelona's reserves in Segunda División B for the 2009–10 season. He totalled 980 minutes of action in his only campaign with the latter, helping them promote to Segunda División.

In the summer of 2010, Luque signed for UD Almería, but appeared only for the B-side during his one-year spell – he was an unused substitute in two La Liga games – following which he moved to Atlético Madrid B also in the third level. He only played 20 league matches the two teams combined.

Puskás Akadémia
In 2012, Luque moved abroad and joined Puskás Akadémia FC, achieving promotion to the top flight in his first year and also winning the championship.

Honours
Puskás
Nemzeti Bajnokság II: 2012–13

References

External links

MLSZ profile 

1990 births
Living people
Sportspeople from Sabadell
Spanish footballers
Footballers from Catalonia
Association football midfielders
Segunda División B players
Tercera División players
Villarreal CF C players
FC Barcelona Atlètic players
UD Almería B players
Atlético Madrid B players
CE L'Hospitalet players
CE Manresa players
Nemzeti Bajnokság I players
Puskás Akadémia FC players
Liga II players
FC Rapid București players
First Professional Football League (Bulgaria) players
PFC Lokomotiv Plovdiv players
UE Sant Julià players
Spain youth international footballers
Spanish expatriate footballers
Expatriate footballers in Hungary
Expatriate footballers in Romania
Expatriate footballers in Bulgaria
Expatriate footballers in Andorra
Spanish expatriate sportspeople in Hungary
Spanish expatriate sportspeople in Romania
Spanish expatriate sportspeople in Bulgaria
Spanish expatriate sportspeople in Andorra